Bruno Báez (born 6 April 2000) is an Argentine professional footballer who plays as a forward for Arsenal de Sarandí.

Career
Báez played for Club Matienzo at youth level, prior to joining Arsenal de Sarandí in 2018. He made the breakthrough into the latter's first-team squad in November 2020, with manager Sergio Rondina selecting him to come off the bench in a home defeat to Unión Santa Fe on 20 November; replacing Gastón Suso in the Copa de la Liga Profesional fixture. After a further appearance against River Plate on 27 December, Báez scored his first goal during a 1–0 home win over Huracán on 10 January.

Career statistics
.

Notes

References

External links

2000 births
Living people
People from General López Department
Argentine footballers
Association football forwards
Argentine Primera División players
Arsenal de Sarandí footballers
Sportspeople from Santa Fe Province